Ricardo Antonio Pontvianne (20 October 1943 – 13 August 2018) was a Mexican basketball player who competed in the 1964 Summer Olympics and in the 1968 Summer Olympics. He was born in Tampico, Tamaulipas.

References

1943 births
2018 deaths
Basketball players at the 1964 Summer Olympics
Basketball players at the 1967 Pan American Games
Basketball players at the 1968 Summer Olympics
Basketball players from Tamaulipas
Mexican men's basketball players
1963 FIBA World Championship players
1967 FIBA World Championship players
Mexican people of French descent
Olympic basketball players of Mexico
Pan American Games medalists in basketball
Pan American Games silver medalists for Mexico
Sportspeople from Tampico, Tamaulipas
Medalists at the 1967 Pan American Games